Allen W. Snyder was an American football player and coach of football, basketball, and baseball.  He was the fourth head football coach at Bowling Green State Normal School—now known as Bowling Green State University—serving for one season in 1922 and compiling a record of 4–2–1.  Snyder was also the head basketball coach at Bowling Green State Normal during the 1922–23 season, tallying a mark of 9–4, and the school's head baseball coach in the spring of 1923, notching a record of 5–3.

Head coaching record

Football

References

Year of birth missing
Year of death missing
Bowling Green Falcons baseball coaches
Bowling Green Falcons football coaches
Bowling Green Falcons men's basketball coaches
Wooster Fighting Scots football coaches